The Raid on York (also known as the Candlemas Massacre) took place on 24 January 1692 during King William's War, when Chief Madockawando and Father Louis-Pierre Thury led 200-300 natives into the town of York (then in the District of Maine and part of the Province of Massachusetts Bay, now in the state of Maine), killing about 100 of the English settlers and burning down buildings, taking another estimated 80 villagers hostage. The villagers were forced to walk to Canada, New France, where they were ransomed by Capt. John Alden Jr. of Boston (son of John Alden and Priscilla Mullins of the Plymouth Colony). One of those taken captive was a young Jeremiah Moulton, who would later gain notoriety during the Father Rale's War.

Capt. Floyd wrote that "the houses are all burned and rifled except the half dozen or thereabout"...later in the same letter he adds: "there is about seventeen or eighteen houses burned". Forty-eight people were buried by Capt. Floyd, and the remaining number were young children whose names never appeared on the existing town records.

Amongst those killed was Reverend Shubael Dummer, the Congregational church minister; Dummer was shot at his own front door, while Dummer's wife, Lydia and their son, were carried away captive where "through snows and hardships among those dragons of the desert she also quickly died"; nothing further was heard of the boy. The Indians set fire to all undefended houses on the north side of the York River, the principal route for trade and around which the town had grown. After the settlement was reduced to ashes, however, it was rebuilt on higher ground at what is today York Village.

Capt. John Flood, who had come with the militia from Portsmouth, found on his arrival that "the greatest part of the whole town was burned and robbed," with nearly 50 killed and another 100 captured. He reported that Rev. Dummer was "barbarously murthered, stript naked, cut and mangled by these sons of Beliall."

There is a memorial plaque in York on a large stone where, according to the plaque, Abenaki Indians left their snowshoes before creeping into York and attacking the settlers.

See also
List of massacres in Maine

References

Further reading
 Raid on York - Residents
 History of York, Maine (1886)
 

Abenaki
Military history of Acadia
Military history of Nova Scotia
Military history of New England
Military history of Canada
King William's War
Massacres in the Thirteen Colonies
Massacres by Native Americans
Pre-statehood history of Maine
1692 in the Thirteen Colonies
York, Maine
Massacres committed by France
Murder in Maine
Massacres in 1692